Donald Bende Bende (born 17 August 1995) is an Ivorian professional footballer who most recently played as a midfielder for EIF.

Career
In 2014, Bende Bene signed for Honvéd in Hungary from the youth academy of Milan, one of Italy's most successful clubs.

In 2016, he trialed for Ringkøbing IF in the Danish third division.

Before the second half of the 2016–17 season, he signed for Moldovan side Saxan.

In July 2017, he trialled with Nea Salamis Famagusta FC of the Cypriot First Division.

Before the 2019 season, Bende Bende signed for EIF in the Finnish second division.

References

External links
 

Living people
1995 births
Ivorian footballers
Association football midfielders
Moldovan Super Liga players
Ykkönen players
FC Saxan players
Ekenäs IF players
Budapest Honvéd FC players
Ivorian expatriate footballers
Expatriate footballers in Italy
Ivorian expatriate sportspeople in Italy
Ivorian expatriate sportspeople in Hungary
Expatriate footballers in Hungary
Ivorian expatriate sportspeople in Moldova
Expatriate footballers in Moldova
Ivorian expatriate sportspeople in Finland
Expatriate footballers in Finland